Lentekhi (Lenṫexis municiṗaliṫeṫi) is a district of Georgia, in the region of Racha-Lechkhumi and Kvemo Svaneti. Its main town is Lentekhi.

Politics
Lentekhi Municipal Assembly (Georgian: ლენტეხის საკრებულო, Lentekhi Sakrebulo) is a representative body in Lentekhi Municipality, consisting of 21 members which is elected every four years. The last election was held in October 2021. Gia Oniani of Georgian Dream was elected mayor.

See also 
 List of municipalities in Georgia (country)

References

External links 
 Districts of Georgia, Statoids.com

Municipalities of Racha-Lechkhumi and Kvemo Svaneti